Lone Texan is a 1959 American Western film directed by Paul Landres and written by James Landis and Jack W. Thomas. The film stars Willard Parker, Grant Williams, Audrey Dalton, Douglas Kennedy, June Blair and Dabbs Greer. The film was released on March 1, 1959, by 20th Century Fox.

Plot

Cast 
 Willard Parker as Clint Banister
 Grant Williams as Greg Banister
 Audrey Dalton as Susan Harvey
 Douglas Kennedy as Maj. Phillip Harvey
 June Blair as Florrie Stuart
 Dabbs Greer as Doc Jansen
 Barbara Heller as Amy Todd
 Rayford Barnes as Finch
 Tyler McVey as Henry Biggs
 Lee Farr as Riff
 Jimmy Murphy as Rio (as Jim Murphy)
 Richard Monahan as Jesse (as Dick Monaghan)
 Robert Dix as Carpetbagger
 Gregg Barton as Ben Hollis
 I. Stanford Jolley as Trader
 Sid Melton as Gus Pringle
 Shirley Haven as Nancy (as Shirle Haven)

References

External links 
 

1959 films
20th Century Fox films
American Western (genre) films
1959 Western (genre) films
Films directed by Paul Landres
Films scored by Paul Dunlap
1950s English-language films
1950s American films